Peach Orchard Township is one of twelve townships in Ford County, Illinois, USA.  As of the 2010 census, its population was 608 and it contained 276 housing units.  It was formed from a portion of Sullivant Township on September 14, 1868.

Geography

Cities, towns, villages
 Melvin

Cemeteries
The township contains Melvin Cemetery.

Major highways
  Illinois Route 54

Demographics

School districts
 Gibson City-Melvin-Sibley Community Unit School District 5

Political districts
 Illinois' 15th congressional district
 State House District 105
 State Senate District 53

References
 
 United States Census Bureau 2007 TIGER/Line Shapefiles
 United States National Atlas

External links
 City-Data.com
 Illinois State Archives

Townships in Ford County, Illinois
Townships in Illinois